Miss Europe 2005, was the 57th edition Miss Europe pageant and the second edition under Endemol France. It was held in Paris, France on March 12, 2005. Shermine Shahrivar of Germany, was crowned Miss Europe 2005 by outgoing titleholder Zsuzsanna Laky of Hungary.

Results

Placements

Judges 
 Élodie Gossuin
 Michel Levaton
 Paco Rabanne
 Charles Aznavour
 Adriana Sklenaříková

Contestants 

 - Luysya Tovmasyan
 - Ol'ga Gerasimovich
 - Tatiana Silva
 - Selma Sejtanic
 - Kristina Radneva
 - Valentina Lesic
 - Eliana Charalambous
 - Edita Hortová
 - Heidi Zadeh
 - Laura Shields
 - Aljona Kordas
 - Mira Salo
 - Cindy Fabre
 - Shermine Shahrivar
 - Helen Gustafson
 - Valia Kakouti
 - Eszter Toth
 - Sigrun Bender
 - Cathriona Duignam
 - Keren Friedman
 - Julija Djadenko
 -  Denise Renée Huizer
 - Irina Sili
 - Tessa Amber Brix
 - Ann Jeanett Ersdal
 - Karolina Gorazda
 - Marina Raquel G. Rodrigues
 - Andrea Raduna
 - Diana Zaripova
 Serbia and Montenegro - Sandra Obradovic
 - Tatiana Keremeryova
 - Farah Ahmed Ali
 - Marie Dahlin
 - Céline Nusbaumer
 - Birce Akalay
 - Hanna Dehtyar

References

External links 
 

Miss Europe
2005 in Europe
2005 beauty pageants